Nuestra Belleza Nayarit 2012, was held at the Teatro del Pueblo "Alí Chumacero" of Tepic, Nayarit on May 24, 2012. At the conclusion of the final night of competition Jasibi Suma from the Riviera Nayarita was crowned the winner. Suma was crowned by outgoing Nuestra Belleza Nayarit titleholder Linda Ugarte. Six contestants competed for the title.

Results

Placements

Contestants

References

External links
 Official Website

Nuestra Belleza México